Bilateral relations between Australia and Israel, were established in 1949. Australia has an embassy in Tel Aviv and Israel has an embassy in Canberra. Relations between the two countries' governments have often been shaped by the Israeli–Palestinian conflict. John Howard, Prime Minister of Australia between 1996 and 2007, has stated that "[Australia's] capacity to influence events within the region is limited and should not be over-stated".

On 28 March 2019, the governments of Australia and Israel signed the first tax treaty between the two countries, to prevent double taxation and tax avoidance. In 2017–18, total merchandise trade between Australia and Israel was worth over $1 billion, and Israel's investment in Australia in 2017 was $301 million. The treaty entered into force on 1 January 2020 after both countries completed their domestic ratification procedures. In 2013, Australia's Department of Foreign Affairs describes Australia and Israel as having "a healthy commercial relationship with two-way trade worth $919 million." In 2015–16, two-way goods and services trade amounted to $1.3 billion, of which Australian exports were worth $349 million and imports from Israel $952 million. In 2015, Australian investment in Israel totalled $663 million and Israeli investment in Australia was $262 million.

History

Four Australian Light Horse brigades and a battalion of camel troops took part in the British conquest of Palestine in 1916–1917. The Australian-Jewish general John Monash was a leader of the Australian Zionist movement. Australian soldiers fought in the Middle East in World War II. The Australian foreign minister H.V. Evatt served as Chairman of the UN General Assembly's Ad Hoc Committee on Palestine and helped to push through the UN Partition Plan on November 29, 1947. Australia was the first country to vote in favour of the plan despite heavy pressure from the United Kingdom on its fellow Commonwealth nations to abstain on the resolution.

Australia's position
Israel and Australia have had diplomatic relations since the Australian government of Ben Chifley recognised Israel on 28 January 1949.

The Liberal–Country Party Coalition supported Israel during and after the 1967 Six-Day War. However, the subsequent Labor government led by Gough Whitlam, elected in 1972, shifted to what was described as a more "even-handed" approach to relations. The change came after the Yom Kippur War of 1973, and was linked with Whitlam's desire to be on friendlier terms with Arab countries.

The subsequent Liberal government led by Malcolm Fraser, elected in 1975, expressed "support for United Nations Security Council Resolutions 242, 338 and 339 as providing the basis for a peaceful settlement". Fraser later said that Australia should "make more plain our commitment to the survival of Israel". In 1980, Andrew Peacock, then Minister for Foreign Affairs, said that "peace should be based ... upon Israel's rights to exist within secure and recognised boundaries; and upon recognition of the legitimate rights of the Palestinian people to a homeland alongside Israel". Peacock's statement was echoed by Fraser in 1982, who said "the legitimate rights of the Palestinians include a homeland alongside Israel".

In the 1980s, Bob Hawke opposed the UN resolution equating Zionism with racism. Ties with Israel were strengthened under Prime Minister John Howard and Foreign Minister Alexander Downer, who supported Israel in the 2006 Lebanon War.

In Israel, Anzac Day is commemorated at the Commonwealth War cemetery on Mount Scopus in Jerusalem. The Australian Soldier Park in Beersheba is dedicated to the memory of the Australian Light Horse regiment that charged at Beersheba and defeated the Turks in World War I.

A 2014 BBC World Service opinion poll found that 67% of Australians had a negative view of Israel's influence and 24% had a positive view. However, Israel was viewed less negatively than in the 2007 survey. Of the countries surveyed, only Indonesia and the UK had a greater proportion of their population view Israel negatively. No similar survey was conducted to ascertain Israeli perceptions of Australia.

In December 2016, Foreign Minister Julie Bishop openly distanced Australia from the United States in response to their abstention regarding UNSC Resolution 2334, suggesting that Australia would have voted against the resolution had it been in the Security Council. Australia was the only nation to have spoken out against the resolution besides Israel.

In February 2017, Prime Minister Benjamin Netanyahu became the first incumbent Israeli leader to visit Australia. Netanyahu met with the Prime Minister and Malcolm Turnbull, Governor-General Sir Peter Cosgrove and other state and federal politicians.

In May 2018, Australia's ambassador to Israel, Chris Cannan, along with other diplomats from Western powers, did not attend the opening of the new United States embassy in Jerusalem.

In October 2018, Australian prime minister Scott Morrison announced Australia was reviewing whether to move Australia's embassy in Israel from Tel Aviv to Jerusalem, and recognizing Jerusalem as the capital of Israel. In December 2018, Morrison announced Australia has recognised West Jerusalem as the capital of Israel but will not immediately move its embassy from Tel Aviv.

In October 2022, Australia reversed the previous government's decision and stated it would no longer recognise West Jerusalem as Israel's capital. Foreign Minister Penny Wong reaffirmed that Jerusalem's status should be decided through peace negotiations between Israelis and Palestinians.

Many politicians, including Prime Minister Anthony Albanese, have openly condemned the Boycott, Divestment and Sanctions (BDS) movement.

Criticism of Israel
In the early 1980s, Australia's Minister for Foreign Affairs, Tony Street, criticised Israeli's Jerusalem Law and Golan Heights Law. When Israel invaded Lebanon in 1982, Australian Prime Minister Malcolm Fraser said Israel's actions were "of the gravest concern to the Australian Government and people", and were "short sighted and foolish".

In May 2010, the Australian government expelled an Israeli diplomat over the use of Australian passports forged by the Israeli government which were used in the assassination of Mahmoud Al-Mabhouh. Foreign Minister Stephen Smith said that Israel had forged Australian passports previously, and while "Australia remains a firm friend of Israel ... our relationship must be conducted on the basis of mutual trust and respect".

Tension rose again after the Gaza flotilla raid, in which an Australian citizen was injured. Prime Minister Kevin Rudd condemned Israel's actions.

In 2013, the ABC reported that a dual Australian-Israeli citizen, Ben Zygier, had died in Israeli custody in 2010. The ABC reported that Zygier, who had worked for Israeli security agency, Mossad, had been imprisoned after unintentionally sabotaging a spy operation dedicated to repatriating the bodies of Israeli soldiers killed during the Israel-Lebanon war of the 1980s. This story reignited discussion about the potential for conflicts arising from dual citizenship in general, and about Jewish Australians' relationships to Israel.

See also
 History of the Jews in Australia
 International recognition of Israel
 Israeli Australians

References

External links

Australia-Israel Chamber of Commerce

 
Israel
Bilateral relations of Israel